Abu al-Abbas Ahmad ibn Khalid an-Nasiri as-Slawi,  (1834/5-1897) was born in Sla, Morocco and is considered to be the greatest Moroccan historian of the 19th century. He was a prominent scholar and a member of the family that founded the Nasiriyya Sufi order in the 17th century. He wrote an important multivolume history of Morocco: . The work is a general history of Morocco and the Islamic west from the Islamic conquest to the end of the 19th century. He died in 1897 shortly after having put the finishing touches to his chronicle.

Notes

External links
M. Th. Houtsma, E.J. Brill's first encyclopaedia of Islam, 1913-1936, Volume 1, BRILL, 1993, p. 468-9, entry "Al-Slawi"  (retrieved on August 9, 2010)

19th-century Moroccan historians
1835 births
1897 deaths
People from Salé